USS Willamette  was a proposed United States Navy screw sloop-of-war or steam frigate that was cancelled in 1866 without ever having been laid down.

Willamette was a wooden-hulled bark-rigged  (or ship-rigged) Contoocook-class screw sloop-of-war  or steam frigate with a single funnel slated to be built for the Union Navy late in the American Civil War. The contract for her construction was cancelled in 1866 before her keel was laid.

References 
Notes

Bibliography
 
 

 

Sloops of the United States Navy
American Civil War ships of the United States
Cancelled ships of the United States Navy